Swine most commonly refers to the domestic pig.

Swine may also refer to:

Animal
Domestic pigs; known to experts as the species Sus domesticus or the subspecies Sus scrofa domesticus
The wild boar, Sus scrofa, the species from which domestic swine were domesticated
 Any species of the Genus Sus; see pig, including Sus scrofa and other species native to Southeast Asia and the Pacific
Any mammal of the subfamily Suinae, including Sus and closely related extinct genera
Any mammal in the Family Suidae, including the Suinae and other, mostly extinct subfamilies

Place name
Swine, East Riding of Yorkshire, a village and civil parish
Swine railway station, on the Hull and Hornsea Railway
Swine, German name of the river Świna flowing from the Oder Lagoon to the Baltic Sea

Other
Swine influenza, an infection caused by any one of several types of swine influenza viruses
S.W.I.N.E., a real-time tactics game designed by FishTank Studio
, a coastal tanker involved in World War II
"Swine (song)", a song by Lady Gaga
"Swine", a 1994 song by Crunt
Swine (film), a film by Robbie Lockie and Damien Clarkson
 S.W.I.N.E., "Students Wildly Indignant about Nearly Everything!", Al Capp's satire in his cartoon Li'l Abner

See also
Pearls Before Swine (disambiguation)
Pig (disambiguation)
Hog (disambiguation)
Boar (disambiguation)